Pau may refer to:

Places
 Pau (Aachen), a river in North Rhine-Westphalia, Germany
 Pau (river), a river of south-western France (Gave de Pau)
 Pau, Edom, a city in the Bible
 Pau, Pyrénées-Atlantiques, France, a city
 Arrondissement of Pau, a district containing the French city
 Pau, Sardinia, a municipality
 Pau, Spain, a municipality
 La Pau (Barcelona Metro), a station
 Lac Pau, a lake near Caniapiscau, Quebec, Canada - see Lac Pau (Caniapiscau) Water Aerodrome

People
 Pau (given name)
 Pau (surname)
 Maria de la Pau Janer (born 1966), Spanish writer

Schools
 Pacific Adventist University, Papua New Guinea
 Palo Alto University, in Palo Alto, California, United States
 Polska Akademia Umiejętności, Polish Academy of Learning
 Prueba de Acceso a la Universidad, see Selectividad
 Punjab Agricultural University, India

Other uses
 Pau (unit), a unit of capacity used in Brunei, Malaysia, Sabah, and Sarawak
 Pau Grand Prix, an auto race
 Pau FC, a French association football club
 Penetrating atherosclerotic ulcer (PAU) of the aorta
 pāʻū, Hawaiian feather skirt (see Feather cloak)
 PAU, IATA code for Pauk Airport, Burma
 pau, ISO 639 codes for the Palauan language
 Pau, alternative spelling for baozi (steamed Chinese buns), sometimes used in Malaysia